Möldri may refer to:
Möldri, Saare County, village in Salme Parish, Saare County
Möldri, Rõuge Parish, village in Rõuge Parish, Võru County
Möldri, Võru Parish, village in Võru Parish, Võru County